Bormida may refer to:
 Bormida (river), a river of northwest Italy
 Bormida di Spigno, a tributary
 Bormida, Liguria, a town in the Province of Savona, Italy
 Italian ship Bormida (A 5359), an Italian Navy water tanker commissioned in 1974
 Eliana Bórmida (born 1946), Argentine architect

See also